Discord is a VoIP and instant messaging social platform. Users have the ability to communicate with voice calls, video calls, text messaging, media and files in private chats or as part of communities called "servers". A server is a collection of persistent chat rooms and voice channels which can be accessed via invite links. Discord runs on Windows, macOS, Android, iOS, iPadOS, Linux, and in web browsers. , the service has over 350million registered users and over 150million monthly active users.

History 
The concept of Discord came from Jason Citron, who had founded OpenFeint, a social gaming platform for mobile games, and Stanislav Vishnevskiy, who had founded Guildwork, another social gaming platform. Citron sold OpenFeint to GREE in 2011 for million, which he used to found Hammer & Chisel, a game development studio, in 2012. Their first product was Fates Forever, released in 2014, which Citron anticipated to be the first MOBA game on mobile platforms, but it did not become commercially successful.

According to Citron, during the development process, he noticed how difficult it was for his team to work out tactics in games like Final Fantasy XIV and League of Legends using available voice over IP (VoIP) software. This led to the development of a chat service with a focus on user friendliness with minimal impact to performance. The name Discord was chosen because it "sounds cool and has to do with talking", was easy to say, spell, remember, and was available for trademark and website. In addition, "Discord in the gaming community" was the problem they wished to solve.

To develop Discord, Hammer & Chisel gained additional funding from YouWeb's 9+ incubator, which had also funded the startup of Hammer & Chisel, and from Benchmark capital and Tencent.

Discord was publicly released in May 2015 under the domain name discordapp.com. According to Citron, they made no specific moves to target any specific audience, but some gaming-related subreddits quickly began to replace their IRC links with Discord links. Discord became widely used by esports and LAN tournament gamers. The company benefited from relationships with Twitch streamers and subreddit communities for Diablo and World of Warcraft.

In January 2016, Discord raised an additional $20million in funding, including an investment from WarnerMedia (then TimeWarner). In 2019, WarnerMedia Investment Group was shut down and acquired by AT&T, selling its equity.

Microsoft announced in April 2018 that it will provide Discord support for Xbox Live users, allowing them to link their Discord and Xbox Live accounts so that they can connect with their Xbox Live friends list through Discord.

In December 2018, the company announced it raised $150million in funding at a $2billion valuation. The round was led by Greenoaks Capital with participation from Firstmark, Tencent, IVP, Index Ventures and Technology Opportunity Partners.

In March 2020, Discord changed its motto from "Chat for Gamers" to "Chat for Communities and Friends", and introduced server templates. This was part of their response to an increase in users as a result of the COVID-19 pandemic.

In April 2020, Discord's Twitter username was changed from @discordapp to @discord. Later in May 2020, Discord changed its primary domain from discordapp.com to discord.com.

Starting in June 2020, Discord announced it was shifting focus away from video gaming specifically to a more all-purpose communication and chat client for all functions, revealing its new slogan "Your place to talk", along with a revised website. Among other planned changes would be to reduce the number of gaming in-jokes it uses within the client, improving the user onboarding experience, and increasing server capacity and reliability. The company announced it had received an additional $100million in investments to help with these changes.

In March 2021, Discord announced it had hired its first finance chief, former head of finance for Pinterest Tomasz Marcinkowski. An inside source called this one of the first steps for the company towards a potential initial public offering, though co-founder and chief executive officer Jason Citron had stated earlier in the month he was not thinking about taking the company public. Discord doubled its monthly user base to about 140million in 2020. However, they ended talks with Microsoft, opting to stay independent. Instead, Discord launched another round of investment in April 2021. Among those investing into the company was Sony Interactive Entertainment; the company stated that it intended to integrate a portion of Discord's services into the PlayStation Network by 2022.

In May 2021, Discord rebranded its game controller-shaped logo "Clyde" in celebration of its sixth anniversary. The company also changed the color palette of its branding and user interfaces, making it much more saturated, to be more "bold and playful". They also changed its slogan from "your place to talk", to "imagine a place", believing that it would be easier to attach to additional taglines; these changes were met with backlash and criticism from Discord users.

In July 2021, Discord acquired Sentropy, a company that specialized in using artificial intelligence systems to monitor online networks for abusive messages to highlight problematic users, and provide recommendations to users for the means to block such messages or users. With the acquisition, Sentropy's tools will be used exclusively for monitoring Discord servers to help with Discord's goals to prevent harassment of users.

According to Citron, the increased valuation was due to the shift away from "broadcast wide-open social media communication services to more small, intimate places", as well as increased usage from the COVID-19 pandemic. They also captured users that were leaving Facebook and other platforms due to privacy concerns. Citron states that they are still in talks with several potential buyers including all major gaming console manufacturers. From this, the company secured an additional  in further investments in September 2021.

In September 2021, Google sent cease and desist notices to the developers of two of the most popular music bots used on Discord–Groovy and Rythm–which were used on an estimated 36million servers in total. These bots allowed users to request and play songs in a voice channel, taking the songs from YouTube ad-free. Two weeks later, Discord partnered with YouTube to test a "Watch Together" feature, which allows Discord users to watch YouTube videos together.

Citron had posted mockup images of Discord around the proposed Web3 principles with integrated cryptocurrency and non-fungible token support in November 2021, leading to criticism from its userbase. Citron later stated that "We appreciate all the perspectives we've been hearing in response to the internal concept you may have seen in a tweet earlier this week and want to clarify we have no plans to ship it at this time. We're excited about the potential for Web3 technology and the positive ways these communities are coming together on Discord, especially those organized around environmentally friendly, creator-focused projects. However, we also recognize there are some problems we need to work through. For now, we're focused on protecting users from spams, scams, and fraud."

As of March 2022, Discord employs 600 people globally.

The CNIL fined Discord €800,000 in November 2022 for being in violation of the European Union's General Data Protection Regulation (GDPR). The violations found by CNIL were that the application would continue to run in the background after it was closed and would not disconnect the user from a voice chat, as well as allowing users to create passwords that only consist of six characters.

Features 
Discord is built to create and manage private and public communities. It gives users access to tools focused around communication services like voice and video calls, persistent chat rooms, and integrations with other gamer-focused services along with the general ability to send direct messages and create personal groups. Although Discord services may initially seem directed only towards gamers, in recent years several new updates have made it more useful for the general population.

Servers 
Discord communities are organized into discrete collections of channels called servers. Although they are referred to as servers on the front end, they are called "guilds" in the developer documentation. Users can create servers for free, manage their public visibility, and create voice channels, text channels, and categories to sort the channels into. Any given server can have up to 800,000 members, as discovered when the official Discord server for the video game Genshin Impact reached maximum capacity, although Discord raised the capacity to over 1,000,000 members for their Snowsgiving 2021 event, an official Discord-controlled server made for the 2021 winter holiday season.

Starting October 2017, Discord allows game developers and publishers to verify their servers. Verified servers, like verified accounts on social media sites, have badges to mark them as official communities. A verified server is moderated by its developers' or publishers' own moderation team. Verification was later extended in February 2018 to include esports teams and musical artists.

By the end of 2017, about 450 servers were verified.

Members can help servers obtain perks in three levels via the "Server Boost" feature, which unlocks higher quality voice channels, more emoji slots, and other perks. Users can buy boosts for servers for $4.99 a month. "Discord Nitro" subscribers get two boosts included in the price of Nitro, and 30% off for additional boosts.

In 2020, Discord unveiled a new feature, known as "Community servers". It includes such features like a custom welcome screen, server insights, and the ability to advertise on Discord's Server Discovery page.

Channels 
Channels may be either used for voice chat and streaming or for instant messaging and file sharing. The visibility and access to channels can be customized to limit access for certain users; for example, marking a channel "NSFW" (Not Safe For Work) requires that first-time viewers confirm they are over 18 years old and willing to see such content.

Text channels support some rich text using Markdown-like syntax, e.g.  to emphasize text, and  notation for inline spoilers. Code blocks with language-specific highlighting can also be used. There is also a nonstandard, Discord-specific  syntax that underlines the text.

Discord launched Stage Channels in May 2021, a feature similar to Clubhouse which allows for live, moderated channels, for audio talks, discussions, and other uses, which can further be potentially gated to only invited or ticketed users. Initially, users could search for open Stage Channels relevant to their interests through a Stage Discovery tool, which was discontinued in October 2021.

In August 2021, Discord launched Threads, which are temporary text channels that can be set to automatically disappear. This is meant to help foster more communication within servers.

In September 2022, Discord launched Forum Channels, which gives the ability provide a space for organized discussions within a channel. Users can create multiple "posts" which work like Threads, organised in a forum-like manner.

Direct messages 
Direct messages in Discord allow users to send messages, share files, live stream their screen, and call others privately outside of servers. An added feature in Discord direct messages is the ability to create message groups of up to 10 users. This acts similar to a server's text channel, with the ability to initiate a call simultaneously for all the members in a direct message group.

User profiles 
Users register for Discord with an email address and must create a username. To allow multiple users to use the same username, they are assigned a four-digit number called a "discriminator" (colloquially a "Discord tag"), prefixed with "#", which is added to the end of their username.

Discord allows users to connect various external platforms to their account, including Steam, Reddit, Twitch, TikTok, Twitter, Spotify, Xbox, PlayStation, and YouTube, among others. These accounts can optionally be shown on the user's profile.

Users can assign themselves a profile picture. Subscribers for Discord Nitro, part of Discord's monetization plan, can use animated profile pictures.

In June 2021, Discord added a feature that allows all users to add an about me section to their profile, as well as a custom colored banner at the top of their profile. Subscribers for Discord Nitro have the added ability to upload a static or animated image as their banner instead of a solid color.

Video calls and streaming 
Video calling and screen sharing were added in October 2017, allowing users to create private video calls with up to 10 users, later increased to 50 due to the increased popularity of video calling during the COVID-19 pandemic.

In August 2019, this was expanded with live streaming channels in servers. A user can share their entire screen, or a specific application, and others in that channel can choose to watch the stream. While these features somewhat mimic the livestreaming capabilities of platforms like Twitch, the company does not plan to compete with these services, as these features were made for small groups.

Digital distribution 
In August 2018, Discord launched a games storefront beta, allowing users to purchase a curated set of games through the service. This will include a "First on Discord" featured set of games that their developers attest to Discord's help in getting launched, giving these games 90 days of exclusivity on the Discord marketplace. Discord Nitro subscribers will also gain access to a rotating set of games as part of their subscription, with the price of Nitro being bumped from $4.99 to $9.99 a month. A cheaper service called 'Nitro Classic' was also released that has the same perks as Nitro but does not include free games.

Following the launch of the Epic Games Store, which challenged Valve's Steam storefront by only taking a 12% cut of game revenue, Discord announced in December 2018 that it would reduce its own revenue cut to 10%.

To further support developers, starting in March 2019 Discord gave the ability for developers and publishers that ran their own servers to offer their games through a dedicated store channel on their server, with Discord managing the payment processing and distribution. This can be used, for example, to give select users access to alpha- and beta-builds of a game in progress as an early access alternative.

Also in March 2019, Discord removed the digital storefront, instead choosing to focus on the Nitro subscription and having direct sales be done through developer's own servers. In September 2019, Discord announced that it was ending its free game service in October 2019 as they found too few people were playing the games offered.

Developer tools 
In December 2016, the company introduced its GameBridge API, which allows game developers to directly integrate with Discord within games.

In December 2017, Discord added a software development kit that allows developers to integrate their games with the service, called "rich presence". This integration is commonly used to allow players to join each other's games through Discord or to display information about a player's game progression in their Discord profile.

Discord also provides tools for users to create their own bots. There are tools such as discord.js that allow bot developers to interact with the Discord API to control their bot.

Documentation for the Discord API is hosted on GitHub and formatted to be displayed on their website.

Unofficial extensions 
While Discord's terms of service prohibit modifying the app, its community has done so anyway. BetterDiscord, for example, has created an open-source desktop modification that allows various plugins to be installed. These plugins augment existing functionalities or add additional ones that are not offered by Discord. One plugin, for example, allows its users to apply custom skins for free; another plugin allows increasing the volume of a voice-call participant beyond the default. BetterDiscord has generally been well-received, though PC Gamer has said it is prone to crashes and bugs. According to BetterDiscord's developers, users of the modification are not at risk of being sanctioned by Discord so long as they do not use additional modifications that further violate the terms of service.

Infrastructure 
Discord is a persistent group chat software, based on an eventually consistent database architecture.

Discord uses the metaphors of servers and channels similar to Internet Relay Chat even though these servers do not map to traditional hardware or virtual servers. They are instead database entities in Discord's servers.

The desktop, web, and iOS apps use React, using React Native on iOS/iPadOS. The Android app was originally written natively, but now shares code with the iOS app. The desktop client is built on the Electron framework using web technologies, which allows it to be multi-platform and operate as an installed application on personal computers.

The software is supported by Google Cloud Platform's infrastructure in more than thirty data centres located in thirteen regions to keep latency with clients low.

Discord uses the Opus audio format, which is low latency and designed to compress speech.

In July 2020, Discord added noise suppression into its mobile app using the Krisp audio-filtering technology.

Discord's backend is written mostly in Elixir and Python, as well as Rust, Go, and C++.

Monetization 
While the software itself comes at no cost, the developers investigated ways to monetize it, with potential options including paid customization options such as emoji or stickers. The developers have stated that while they will look for ways to monetize the software, it will never lose its core features.

In January 2017, the first paid subscription and features were released with "Discord Nitro Classic" (originally released as "Discord Nitro"). For a monthly subscription fee of $4.99, users can get an animated avatar, use custom and/or animated emojis across all servers (non-Nitro users can only use custom emoji on the server they were added to), an increased maximum file size on file uploads (from 8 MB to 50 MB), the ability to screen share in higher resolutions, the ability to choose their own discriminator (from #0001 to #9999) and a unique profile badge.

In October 2018, "Discord Nitro" was renamed "Discord Nitro Classic" with the introduction of the new "Discord Nitro", which cost $9.99 and included access to free games through the Discord game store. Monthly subscribers of Discord Nitro Classic at the time of the introduction of the Discord games store were gifted with Discord Nitro, lasting until January 1, 2020, and yearly subscribers of Discord Nitro Classic were gifted with Discord Nitro until January 1, 2021.

In October 2019, Discord ended their free game service with Nitro.

In June 2019, Discord introduced Server Boosts, a way to benefit specific servers by purchasing a "boost" for it, with enough boosts granting various benefits for the users in that particular server. Each boost is a subscription costing $4.99 a month. For example, if a server maintains 2 boosts, it unlocks perks such as a higher maximum audio quality in voice channels and the ability to use an animated server icon. Users with Discord Nitro or Discord Nitro Classic have a 30% discount on server boost costs, with Nitro subscribers specifically also getting 2 free server boosts.

Discord began testing digital stickers on its platform in October 2020 for users in Canada. Most stickers cost between $1.50 and $2.25 and are part of Discord's monetization strategy. Discord Nitro subscribers received a free "What's Up Wumpus" sticker pack focused on Discord's mascot, Wumpus.

In October 2022, the "Discord Nitro Classic" subscription tier was replaced by a $2.99 "Discord Nitro Basic", which features a subset of features from the $9.99 "Nitro" tier.

Another way Discord makes money is through a 10% commission as the distribution fee from all games sold through game developers' verified servers.

Reception

General reception 
By January 2016, Hammer & Chisel reported that Discord had been used by 3million people, with growth of 1million per month, reaching 11million users in July that year. By December 2016, the company reported it had 25million users worldwide. By the end of 2017, the service had drawn nearly 90million users, with roughly 1.5million new users each week. With the service's third anniversary, Discord stated that it had 130million unique registered users. The company observed that while the bulk of its servers are used for gaming-related purposes, a small number have been created by users for non-gaming activities, like stock trading, fantasy football, and other shared interest groups.

In May 2016, one year after the software's release, Tom Marks, writing for PC Gamer, described Discord as the best VoIP service available. Lifehacker has praised Discord's interface, ease of use, and platform compatibility.

In 2021, Discord had at least 350million registered users across its web and mobile platforms. It was used by 56million people every month, sending a total of 25billion messages per month. By June 2020, the company reported it had 100million active users each month. As of 2021, the service has over 140million monthly active users.

Criticisms

Cyberbullying 
Discord has had problems with hostile behavior and abuse within chats, with some communities of chat servers being "raided" (the taking over of a server by a large number of users) by other communities. This includes flooding with controversial topics related to race, religion, politics, and pornography. Discord has stated that it has plans to implement changes that would "rid the platform of the issue".

To better protect its users and its services since these events, Discord has implemented a trust and safety team to monitor the servers and respond to reports. This includes dealing with user harassment, servers that violate Discord's terms of service, and protecting servers from "raiding" and spamming by malicious users or bots. While they do not directly monitor messages, the trust and safety team can determine malicious activity from service use patterns and/or user-generated reports and take appropriate steps, including more detailed investigation, to deal with the matter. The service plans to expand this team as they continue to gain new users.

In January 2018, The Daily Beast reported that it found several Discord servers that were specifically engaged in distributing revenge porn and facilitating real-world harassment of the victims of these images and videos. Such actions are against Discord's terms of service and Discord shut down servers and banned users identified from these servers.

Use by extremist users and groups 
Discord gained popularity with the alt-right due to the pseudonymity and privacy offered by Discord's service. Analyst Keegan Hankes from the Southern Poverty Law Center stated, "It's pretty unavoidable to be a leader in this [alt-right] movement without participating in Discord." In early 2017, chief executive officer Jason Citron stated Discord was aware of these groups and their servers. Citron stated that servers found to be engaged in illegal activities or violations of the terms of service would be shut down, but would not disclose any examples.

Following the violent events that occurred during the Unite the Right rally in Charlottesville, Virginia, on August 12, 2017, it was found that Discord had been used to plan and organize the white nationalist rally. This included participation by Richard Spencer and Andrew Anglin, high-level figures in the movement. Discord responded by closing servers that supported the alt-right and far-right, and banning users who had participated. Discord's executives condemned "white supremacy" and "neo-Nazism", and said that these groups "are not welcome on Discord". Discord has worked with the Southern Poverty Law Center to identify hateful groups using Discord and ban those groups from the service. Since then, several neo-Nazi and alt-right servers have been shut down by Discord, including those operated by neo-Nazi terrorist group Atomwaffen Division, Nordic Resistance Movement, Iron March, and European Domas.

In March 2019, the media collective Unicorn Riot published the contents of a Discord server used by several members of the white nationalist group Identity Evropa who were also members of the United States Armed Forces. Unicorn Riot has since published member lists and contents of several dozen servers connected to alt-right, white supremacist, and other such movements.

In January 2021, two days after the U.S. Capitol attack, Discord deleted the pro-Donald Trump server The Donald, "due to its overt connection to an online forum used to incite violence, plan an armed insurrection in the United States, and spread harmful misinformation related to 2020 U.S. election fraud", while denying that the server had any direct connection to the attack on the Capitol building. The server had been used by former members of the r/The_Donald subreddit, which Reddit had deleted several months previously.

In January 2022, the British anti-disinformation organization Logically reported that Holocaust denial, neo-Nazism and other forms of hate speech were flourishing on the Discord and Telegram groups for the German website Disclose.tv.

In May 2022, Payton S. Gendron was named as the suspect in a race-driven mass shooting in Buffalo, New York, that killed ten people. It was reported that Gendron used a private Discord server as a diary for weeks as he prepared for the attack. Approximately 30 minutes before the shooting, several users were invited by Gendron to view the server and read the messages. The messages were later published on 4chan. Discord told the press that the server was deleted by moderators shortly after the shooting. The New York state attorney general's office announced an investigation of Discord among other online services in the wake of the shooting to determine if they had taken enough steps to prevent such content from being broadcast on their services, with which Discord said they would comply.

Other content 
Discord has been claimed to have had problems with sexual exploitation of children and young teenagers on its platform.

In July 2018, Discord updated its terms of service to ban drawn pornography with underage subjects. Some Discord users subsequently criticized the moderation staff for selectively allowing "cub" content, or underage pornographic furry artwork, under the same guidelines. The staff held that "cub porn" was separate from lolicon and shotacon, being "allowable as long as it is tagged properly". After numerous complaints from the community, Discord amended its community guidelines in February 2019 to include "non-humanoid animals and mythological creatures as long as they appear to be underage" in its list of disallowed categories, in addition to announcing periodic transparency reports to better communicate with users.

On January 27, 2021, Discord banned the r/WallStreetBets server during the GameStop short squeeze, because of "hateful and discriminatory content", which users found contentious. One day later, Discord allowed another server to be created and began assisting with moderation on it.

See also 
 Comparison of VoIP software
 Comparison of cross-platform instant messaging clients
 List of freeware

Notes

References

Further reading

External links 
 

2015 software
Android (operating system) software
Freeware
Internet properties established in 2015
IOS software
Instant messaging clients for Linux
MacOS instant messaging clients
Windows instant messaging clients
Proprietary cross-platform software
Voice over IP clients for Linux
VoIP software
Web conferencing